Ayyampettai is a census town in Kancheepuram district  in the state of Tamil Nadu, India.

Demographics
 India census, Ayyampettai had a population of 6022.  Males constitute 52% of the population and females 48%. Ayyampettai has an average literacy rate of 66%, higher than the national average of 59.5%; with 58% of the males and 42% of females literate. 10% of the population is under 6 years of age.

Economy
Ayyampettai is basically dependent on weaving kanchipuram silk saris. Rice and Sugarcane are cultivated, irrigation is done by well.

Transport
The banks of River palar is just 3 km away from Ayyampettai bus stop. Buses run frequently throughout the day to Chennai, Chengalpattu, as the village falls in the Kanchipuram-Chengleput Highway.

References 

Cities and towns in Kanchipuram district

it:Ayyampettai (Thanjavur)